The House at 1050 S. Madison Ave. is a historic house located at 1050 South Madison Avenue in Pasadena, California. Architect Reginald D. Johnson designed the Colonial Revival house for himself in 1911. The one-story house has a "U"-shaped plan surrounding a brick terrace in the rear. The house's hipped roof features jerkinhead ends at either side of the front facade; the front door and windows are arranged symmetrically between the two ends. Both the roof and the exterior walls are covered with shingles.

The house was added to the National Register of Historic Places on August 6, 1998.

References

Houses on the National Register of Historic Places in California
Colonial Revival architecture in California
Houses completed in 1911
Buildings and structures on the National Register of Historic Places in Pasadena, California
Houses in Pasadena, California